Anatrachyntis floretella is a moth in the family Cosmopterigidae. It was described by Henry Legrand in 1958, and is known from Seychelles.

References

Moths described in 1958
Anatrachyntis
Moths of Africa